The Norfolk Record Society (NRS) was established in 1930 as a scholarly text publication society to publish historical documents relating to the history of Norwich and the county of Norfolk, England. The Society's objectives were to encourage the study and preservation of historical records relating to Norfolk.

The society is registered as a charity. Its membership is drawn mainly from East Anglia; however, individuals and institutions from around the world are also members.

History 
The Society was founded in 1930. It has published annually a transcript of a significant and sometimes unusual manuscript or collection of manuscripts. The series now covers a time-span ranging from the 12th to 20th centuries. All publications are carefully edited, indexed and include introductions explaining the background of the documents they present.

The Society continues to publish on a wide range of subjects and encourages new researchers and members to submit ideas for future publications.

Activities 
The Society holds an annual lecture in conjunction with its annual publication launch.

The Last Ten Volumes

Norfolk Record Society Resources 
The NRS maintains an extensive collection of historical resources, which are on deposit at the Norfolk Record Office at the Archive Centre in Norwich. Some information is provided on their website.

External links 
 Norfolk Record Society, Official Website
 Norfolk Record Office, Official Website

References 

Historical societies of the United Kingdom
History of Norfolk
Text publication societies
Organisations based in Norwich
1930 establishments in England
Regional and local learned societies of the United Kingdom
History organisations based in the United Kingdom
Book publishing companies of England